Burton Craige Gray (April 1, 1941 – October 27, 1989) was an American economist, entrepreneur, and conservative political theorist. He co-founded Scientific Time Sharing Corporation with Dan Dyer and Lawrence M. Breed, a computer software firm in the Washington, D.C. area specializing in the programming language APL.

Biography
Gray was born in Winston-Salem, North Carolina, and died in Atlanta, Georgia. He was the son of Gordon Gray and brother of C. Boyden Gray.

In 1968, he married Ann Clark. The marriage ended in divorce.
He married Dorothy "Deecy" Stephens on November 5, 1988.
He was a board member of the Reason Foundation and the Philadelphia Society. He was a co-founder of the Federalist Society and active in the Libertarian Party. The Reason Foundation established the Burton C. Gray Memorial Internship in his honor.

References

1941 births
1989 deaths
People from Winston-Salem, North Carolina
American political philosophers
American libertarians
Yale University alumni
20th-century American businesspeople
Bowman Gray family